This is a list of the 21 members of the European Parliament for Sweden in the 2019 to 2024 session.

List

References

Sweden
List
2019